This is a list of ships currently being operated by the Finnish Navy or entering service in the near future, . In the case of a conflict, eight offshore patrol vessels, seven hovercraft and 81 coastal patrol boats from the Finnish Border Guard can be armed and transferred to the Navy.

Summary 
The Finnish navy has 246 ships in one naval fleet, the coastal fleet. Project Squadron 2020 will probably lead to a reorganisation of the navy squadrons. The summary of Finnish naval ships:

 8 Missile Boats
 2 Mine Layers
 3 Mine Ferries
 3 Mine Countermeasure Vessels
 10 Mine Sweepers
 Apr. 196 Landing Craft
 23 Transport Ships
 6 Command Boats
 5 Training Boats
 2 Tugs
 2 Cable Layers
 1 Experimental Boat
 3 Pollution Control Vessels

Combatants

Missile Boats

Mine warfare

Minelayers

Minesweepers

Auxiliaries

Landing craft

Transport

Command launches

Training ships

Other

Tugs

Cable layers

Experimental craft 
Isku was a prototype design for a domestically-made guided missile patrol boat. She was designed with a "seasled" planing hull with a rectangular planform. Isku was armed with four Soviet SS-N-2A Styx missiles and a twin 30mm AK-230 anti-aircraft cannon. The design was a failure as it never reached its designed speed and the vessel was regulated to trial duties. Isku was modified in 1989-90. The missiles were removed, the hull was lengthened by 7 meters and the deckhouse was also extended. Mine rails were added along the length of the hull and an articulated crane was placed in the bow.

Pollution control vessels

Ordered vessels

See also
List of decommissioned ships of the Finnish Navy
Finnish Navy

References

Active

Ships
Finland